Dr Nerina Ramlakhan is a physiologist and sleep therapist. Nerina obtained her B.Sc. and Ph.D. from King's College London. She is the author of Tired But Wired: How to Overcome Your Sleep Problems: The Essential Toolkit. She is also Silentnight's "sleep expert".

References

External links 

 

Living people
Year of birth missing (living people)
Place of birth missing (living people)
Alumni of King's College London
British physiologists
Women physiologists